Sunderland City Centre is the central business district in Sunderland, Tyne and Wear, England. The city centre is just to the west of Sunderland Docks.

History 
In 2020 it was announced that 14 million would be spent on a new car park in the city centre.

Buildings 

 Sunderland station
 The Bridges
 Sunderland Empire Theatre
 Sunderland Civic Centre
 Sunderland Museum and Winter Gardens
 Elephant Tea Rooms

Politics 
Sunderland City Centre is part of the Sunderland Central parliamentary constituency.

For local elections, it is currently divided between three wards of the city council. The majority of the city centre, lying to the west of Fawcett Street and the north of Holmeside, is located in Millfield ward. The eastern parts of the centre beyond Fawcett Street form part of Hendon ward, while the south of the city centre around Park Lane is within St Michael's ward.

References 

Sunderland
City of Sunderland suburbs
Central business districts in the United Kingdom